is a side-scrolling action game by Sega released for the Game Gear in 1991. It was the first Shinobi game developed specifically for a portable game platform. The player controls the modern-day ninja Joe Musashi, protagonist of previous Shinobi games, as he goes on a mission to rescue four kidnapped comrades from an enemy, gaining control of the other ninjas (each with different abilities) as the game progresses in a manner inspired by Mega Man. It was followed by The G.G. Shinobi II: The Silent Fury in 1993. The G.G. Shinobi was one of the first Game Gear games available on the 3DS Virtual Console in March 2012.

Plot
Terror and destruction have made their way to Ninja Valley. The Master of the Oboro school of shinobi sends his best students to investigate the suburban areas. They return with news of a powerful dark force that has established a base within Neo City.

The Master knows that only a warrior trained in the arts of ninjutsu can stand against this menace. One by one his greatest pupils enter Neo City to locate and destroy the source of the evil. Ninja Valley has lost contact with each of them. All are believed to be captured.

Now Joe Musashi the Red Shinobi, must carry out this dire mission. As the oldest and strongest of his ninja disciples, Musashi must use his special skills in the art of ninjutsu to free his fellow shinobi. With their combined strength, they can destroy the City of Fear.

Gameplay
The play mechanics of The G.G. Shinobi are roughly based on the Genesis game The Revenge of Shinobi, but with the addition of a character-switching system. The player starts the game as Joe Musashi (the red ninja), whose goal is to rescue four kidnapped allies who are being held captive in different stages. There are four stages. These can be played in any order. Each ninja character has a unique weapon, ninjutsu (typically consuming one ninjutsu spell) and ability.

After completing all four stages, the player automatically enters the fifth and final stage (Neo City), proceeding through a series of trap rooms. Each room requires the skills of a particular ninja character in order to pass it. Almost all rooms have two exits which lead to further distinct trap rooms. Whilst exploring Neo City, the player will encounter further bosses, finishing with the final one.

Reception
Retro Gamer called The G.G. Shinobi an "unquestionably a classic slice of ninja heaven" but noted it was "notoriously difficult".

References

External links

Hardcore Gaming 101: Shinobi

1991 video games
Game Gear games
Game Gear-only games
Shinobi (series)
Sega video games
Virtual Console games
Video games scored by Yuzo Koshiro
Video games developed in Japan